The Combined Food Board was a temporary World War II government agency that allocated the combined economic resources of the United States and the United Kingdom.  It was set up by President Franklin D. Roosevelt and Prime Minister Winston Churchill on June 9, 1942.  Canada, after insisting on its economic importance, was given a place on the board in November, 1942.  At first the Board was a pawn in a battle between the U.S. Department of Agriculture and the U.S. War
Food Administration.  After that was resolved, the Board ran smoothly, and effectiveness increased. Its major achievement was the multi-nation commodity committees that it set up in 1945, which became the International Emergency Food Council.  It tried to organize responses to a massive shortage of food in war-torn areas. It closed in 1946.

Mission
The mission of the Combined Food Board set out by Roosevelt and Churchill was twofold:

Operations
William Mabane, the Parliamentary Secretary to the Minister of Food, explained to Parliament in May 1943 that, "Food strategy was no mere domestic matter, and a scramble between the United Nations for supplies would be disastrous. Combined Food Board machinery had therefore been set up to prevent competitive buying of foodstuffs in short supply and remove any grievance that one country was going short while there was a surplus elsewhere."

The biggest problem was in limited shipping space in convoys bringing foods from the Western Hemisphere, especially with the heavy demands on shipping imposed by the landings in North Africa in November, 1942. There was barely enough space for bringing in even grain for current needs. Lord Woolton, the  Minister of Food, urgently called on Britons to eat more potatoes and less bread.  He introduced the National Loaf that used much less shipping space, but which consumers could barely stomach.

See also
 Combined Production and Resources Board
 Minister of Food (United Kingdom)
 Rationing in the United Kingdom

Notes

Further reading
 Hall, H. Duncan. North American supply (History of the Second World War; United Kingdom civil series: War production series) (1955), the British perspective 
 Hayward, Edwin J. "Co-Ordination of Military and Civilian Civil Affairs Planning," Annals of the American Academy of Political and Social Science Vol. 267, Military Government (Jan., 1950), pp. 19–27 in JSTOR
 Roll, Eric. The Combined Food Board. A study in wartime international planning (1956).
 Rosen, S. McKee. The combined boards of the Second World War: An experiment in international administration (Columbia University Press, 1951)
 review by Harold Stein, American Political Science Review (1951) 45#4 pp. 1173–1181 in JSTOR
 Willoughby, William R. "The Canada‐United States joint economic agencies of the second world war," Canadian Public Administration (1972) 15#1 pp: 59-73.

United Kingdom–United States relations
Military logistics of World War II